The following is a list of Registered Historic Places in St. Clair County, Michigan.



|}

Listings formerly located in St. Clair County
The following listings were located in St. Clair County at the time they were placed on the Register, but have since moved to other locations.

See also

 List of Michigan State Historic Sites in St. Clair County, Michigan
 List of National Historic Landmarks in Michigan
 National Register of Historic Places listings in Michigan
 Listings in neighboring counties: Lapeer, Macomb, Sanilac

References

St. Clair County
St. Clair County, Michigan
Tourist attractions in Metro Detroit